Andy Adams is the Grosset & Dunlap house name for three writers who authored the Biff Brewster series of adventure and mystery novels for adolescent boys in the early and mid-1960s.  The real-world authors were Walter B. Gibson, Edward Pastore, and Peter Harkins.

References

External links

20th-century American novelists
20th-century American male writers
American mystery novelists
American children's writers
House names
American adventure novelists
American male novelists